The Israel men's national under-18 ice hockey team is the men's national under-18 ice hockey team of Israel. The team is controlled by the Ice Hockey Federation of Israel, a member of the International Ice Hockey Federation. The team represents Israel at the IIHF World U18 Championships.

International competitions

IIHF World U18 Championships

1999: 4th in Division II Europe
2000: 5th in Division II Europe
2001: 8th in Division III
2002: Did not participate
2003: 4th in Division III Group B
2004: 5th in Division III
2005: 3rd in Division III
2006: 2nd in Division III

2007: 5th in Division II Group A
2008: 6th in Division II Group B
2009: Did not participate
2010: 4th in Division III Group B
2011: 4th in Division III Group B
2012: Did not participate
2013: 1st in Division III Group B(Promoted to Division III Group A)
2014: 2nd in Division III Group A
2015: 5th in Division III Group A

Roster
From the 2014 IIHF World U18 Championships

References

External links
Israel at IIHF.com

I
National under-18 ice hockey teams